Camptylochila is a genus of moths of the family Noctuidae. Some authors consider it to be a synonym of Idia. If it is treated as a valid genus, it contains at least the type species Camptylochila undulalis Stephens, 1834.

References
Natural History Museum Lepidoptera genus database

Herminiinae